Demon Box may refer to:
 Demon Box (album), a 1993 album by Motorpsycho
 Demon Box (book), a 1986 book by Ken Kesey

Demon-Box is a US online marketplace headquartered in Longmont City, CO Province. It allows users to unbox mystery boxes which contain different electronic products.